Charles John Innes (June 1, 1901 – November 27, 1971) was an American politician who served as a member of the Massachusetts General Court and was the legal counsel to the Massachusetts Senate.

Innes was born on June 1, 1901 in New York City. His father, Charles Hiller Innes, was a Massachusetts Republican Party leader. Innes graduated from Harvard College in 1922 and the Boston University School of Law in 1926.

From 1927 to 1930, Innes was assistant corporation counsel for the city of Boston. From 1933 to 1943 he was a member of the Massachusetts House of Representatives. He then represented the 3rd Suffolk District in the Massachusetts Senate. From 1947 to 1949 and again from 1951 to 1955 he was the Republican floor leader. In 1956, Innes was named legal counsel to the Senate. He held this position until June 1971, when ill health forced him to step down. He was allowed to stay on as associate counsel until his death on November 27, 1971.

See also
 Massachusetts legislature: 1933–1934, 1935–1936, 1937–1938, 1939, 1941–1942, 1943–1944, 1947–1948, 1949–1950, 1951–1952, 1953–1954, 1955–1956

References

1901 births
1971 deaths
20th-century American politicians
Boston University School of Law alumni
Harvard University alumni
Massachusetts lawyers
Republican Party Massachusetts state senators
Republican Party members of the Massachusetts House of Representatives
People from Boston
20th-century American lawyers